The Roman Catholic Church in Côte d'Ivoire is composed of 4 ecclesiastical provinces and 11 suffragan dioceses.

List of dioceses

Episcopal Conference of Côte d’Ivoire

Ecclesiastical Province of Abidjan
Archdiocese of Abidjan
Diocese of Agboville
Diocese of Grand-Bassam
Diocese of Yopougon

Ecclesiastical Province of Bouaké
Archdiocese of Bouaké
Diocese of Abengourou
Diocese of Bondoukou
Diocese of Yamoussoukro

Ecclesiastical Province of Gagnoa
Archdiocese of Gagnoa
Diocese of Daloa
Diocese of Man
Diocese of San Pedro-en-Côte d'Ivoire

Ecclesiastical Province of Korhogo
Archdiocese of Korhogo
Diocese of Katiola
Diocese of Odienné

External links 
Catholic-Hierarchy entry.
GCatholic.org.

Ivory
Catholic dioceses